Göhrde is an unincorporated area in the German district of Lüchow-Dannenberg,  in size. It contains large parts of the Göhrde State Forest and is unpopulated - the villages of Kollase, Röthen and Zienitz are exclaves of the bordering municipality of Göhrde, not the unincorporated area. It is also bordered by Zernien, as well as the districts of Lüneburg and Uelzen.

References 

Lüchow-Dannenberg
Unincorporated areas of Germany